Edison Awards is an American company that runs an annual competition honoring excellence in innovation in a broad range of categories.

Company

The Edison Awards were established by the American Marketing Association in 1987 and has been an independent enterprise since 2008.

Awards

The Edison Awards are named after the inventor Thomas Edison. 
They honor innovations in product and service development, marketing and human-centered design.
Categories range from green technology to medical breakthroughs.
Entrants must meet strict innovation criteria and competencies as defined in the book Innovate Like Edison: The Success System of America's Greatest Inventor (Gelb & Caldicott 2007).
The Edison Awards Steering Committee reviews nominations; the finalists are then voted on by a large panel drawn from business professionals, scientists and academia.
Entries are judged based on societal impact, creativity and marketplace success.
In 2013, there were 14 categories and 38 sub-categories, with 131 award recipients.

Recipients

Past recipients of the Edison Achievement Award include:

 1991 – Herb Baum – Campbell Soup Co.
 1991 – Frank Perdue – Perdue Farms
 1992 – William McGowan – MCI Corporation
 1993 – J. Willard Marriott, Jr. – Marriott International
 1993 – Jay Van Andel – Amway Corporation
 1993 – Raymond W. Smith – Bell Atlantic
 1993 – Rich DeVos – Amway Corporation
 1994 – Bert C. Roberts – MCI Corporation
 1994 – H. John Greeniaus – Nabisco, Inc.
 1995 – Arthur Martinez – Sears, Roebuck & Co.
 1995 – Robert Palmer – Digital Corporation
 1996 – Douglas Ivester – Coca-Cola Company
 1996 – Nolan D. Archibald – Black & Decker
 1997 – Reuben Mark – Colgate-Palmolive
 1997 – Martha Stewart – MSL Omnimedia
 1999 – Dale Morrison – Campbell Soup Co.
 1999 – Ted Turner – Time Warner
 2009 – David M. Kelley – IDEO
 2009 – Susan Desmond-Hellmann – Genentech
 2010 – A.G. Lafley – Procter & Gamble
 2010 – Susan Hockfield – MIT
 2011 – Alan Mulally – Ford Motor Company
 2011 – John S. Hendricks – Discovery Communications
 2012 – Chris Anderson – TED
 2012 – Steve Jobs – Apple, Inc.
 2013 – Paul E. Jacobs – Qualcomm
 2014 – Elon Musk – Tesla, SpaceX
 2014 – Yang Yuanqing – Lenovo
 2015 – Clayton M. Christensen – Harvard Business School
 2015 – Robert A. Lutz – General Motors Company
 2016 – John Chambers – Cisco Systems, Inc.
 2017 – Astro Teller – X
 2017 – Jeff Immelt – General Electric
 2018 – Marillyn Hewson – Lockheed Martin
 2019 – Ginni Rometty – IBM
 2021 – Jennifer Holmgren, Reinhold Schmieding

References

American awards
Engineering awards
Design awards
Business and industry awards